Government Medical College, Rajnandgaon (also known as Atal Bihari Vajpayee Memorial Government Medical College) is a government medical school located in Rajnandgaon, Chhattisgarh, India. It is affiliated to Pt. Deendayal Upadhyay Memorial Health Sciences and Ayush University of Chhattisgarh, Raipur.

Academics
Currently, the institute offers M.B.B.S. with an intake capacity of 125 per batch.

References

Medical colleges in Chhattisgarh
Colleges affiliated to Pt. Deendayal Upadhyay Memorial Health Sciences and Ayush University of Chhattisgarh
Rajnandgaon
2014 establishments in Chhattisgarh
Educational institutions established in 2014